Max Raditschnigg (born 6 May 1983) is a former Austrian tennis player.

Raditschnigg has a career high ATP singles ranking of 440 achieved on 22 May 2006. He also has a career high ATP doubles ranking of 240 achieved on 4 April 2011.

Raditschnigg made his ATP main draw debut at the 2005 Austrian Open in the doubles draw partnering Patrick Schmölzer.

References

External links

1983 births
Living people
Austrian male tennis players